is a railway station on the Seibu Ikebukuro Line in Toshima, Tokyo, Japan, operated by the private railway operator Seibu Railway.

Lines
Only all-stations "Local" services stop at this station.

Station layout
The station has two ground-level island platforms serving four tracks. The platforms are capable of handling 10-car trains.

Platforms

History
Higashi-Nagasaki Station opened on 15 April 1915. While the name of the district in which the station is located is actually Nagasaki, the station was named Higashi-Nagasaki to avoid confusion with Nagasaki Station in Kyushu.

Station numbering was introduced during fiscal 2012, with Higashi-Nagasaki Station becoming "SI03".

Passenger statistics
In fiscal 2013, the station was the 37th busiest on the Seibu network with an average of 27,072 passengers daily.

The passenger figures for previous years are as shown below.

Surrounding area
 Ochiai-minami-nagasaki Station (Toei Oedo Line)

References

External links

 Higashi-Nagasaki Station information (Seibu Railway)] 

Railway stations in Japan opened in 1915
Seibu Ikebukuro Line
Railway stations in Tokyo